The Gulf of Alaska (Tlingit: Yéil T'ooch’) is an arm of the Pacific Ocean defined by the curve of the southern coast of Alaska, stretching from the Alaska Peninsula and Kodiak Island in the west to the Alexander Archipelago in the east, where Glacier Bay and the Inside Passage are found.

The Gulf shoreline is a combination of forest, mountain and a number of tidewater glaciers.  Alaska's largest glaciers, the Malaspina Glacier and Bering Glacier, spill out onto the coastal line along the Gulf of Alaska. The coast is heavily indented with Cook Inlet and Prince William Sound, the two largest connected bodies of water. It includes Yakutat Bay and Cross Sound. Lituya Bay (a fjord north of Cross Sound, and south of Mount Fairweather) is the site of the largest recorded tsunami in history. It serves as a sheltered anchorage for fishing boats.

of Alaska is considered a Class I, productive ecosystem with more than 300 grams of carbon per square meter per year<ref name="Hogan2011">{{cite journal |author=Hogan, C. Michael |year=2011 |title=Gulf of Alaska. Topic ed. P.Saundry. Ed.-in-chief C.J.Cleveland. Encyclopedia of Earth |journal=National Council for Science and the Environment |url=http://www.eoearth.org/article/Gulf_of_Alaska?topic=49523 |access-date=June 13, 2013}}</ref> based on SeaWiFS data.

Deep water corals can be found in the Gulf of Alaska. Primnoa pacifica has contributed to the location being labeled as Habitat Areas of Particular Concern.

Thanks to Gulf Stream, while the Okhotsk Sea was "closed by ice in winter", just 10° further north, the "Gulf of Alaska was ice-free throughout the year".
In 1977, the Gulf of Alaska started to manifest an unexpected and at that time inexplicable shift on its normal climate regime, resulting in a growth of the mean temperature of the sea surface and in an increased availability and variety of commercial fish species. A similar volatile climate change was observed during the 1970s in the North Pacific seas.

Meteorology 
The Gulf is a great generator of storms. In addition to dumping vast quantities of snow and ice on southern Alaska, resulting in some of the largest concentrations south of the Arctic Circle, many of the storms move south along the coasts of British Columbia, Washington, Oregon, and as far south as Southern California (primarily during El Niño events). Much of the seasonal rainfall and snowfall in the Pacific Northwest and Southwestern United States comes from the Gulf of Alaska.

Extent 
The International Hydrographic Organization defines the limits of the Gulf of Alaska as follows:
On the north. The coast of Alaska.

On the south. A line drawn from Cape Spencer, the northern limit of the Coastal Waters of Southeast Alaska and British Columbia to Kabuch Point, the southeast limit of the Bering Sea, in such a way that all the adjacent islands are included in the Gulf of Alaska.

The US Geological Survey's Geographic Names Information System database defines the Gulf of Alaska as bounded on the north by the coast of Alaska and on the south by a line running from the south end of Kodiak Island on the west to Dixon Entrance on the east.

Islands 

 Admiralty Island
 Afognak Island
 Aghiyuk Island
 Aiaktalik Island
 Akun Island
 Akutan Island
 Aleutika Island
 Amaknak Island
 Adronica Island
 Annette Island
 Anyaka Island
 Ariadne Island
 Augustine Island
 Avatanak Island
 Baker Island
 Ban Island
 Baranof Island
 Beautiful Isle
 Bell Island
 Benjamin Island
 Biorka Island
 Bligh Island
 Chat Island
 Chenega Island
 Chichagof Island
 Chisik Island
 Chiswell Island(s)
 Chowiet Island
 Coronation Island
 Cronin Island
 Culross Island
 Dall Island
 Deer Island
 Doggie Island
 Dolgoi Island
 Douglas Island
 Duke Island
 East Chugach Island
 Egg Island
 Egg Island(s)
 Eldred Rock
 Eleanor Island
 Elizabeth Island
 Erlington Island
 Esther Island
 Etolin Island
 Fish Island
 Fitzgerald Island
 Forrester Island
 Goloi Island
 Granite Island
 Gravina Island
 Green Island
 Gregson Island
 Gull Island
 Haenke Island
 Harbor Island
 Hawkins Island
 Heceta Island
 Herring Island(s)
 Hesketh Island
 Hinchinbrook Island
 Kalgin Island
 Kanak Island
 Karpa Island
 Kataguni Island
 Kayak Island
 Khantaak Island
 Knight Island
 Kodiak Island
 Korovin Island
 Kosciusko Island
 Kriwoi Island
 Kruzof Island
 Kuiu Island
 Kupreanof Island
 Latouche Island
 Lemesurier Island
 Lincoln Island
 Lone Island
 Long Island
 Lulu Island
 Lynn Brothers
 Ma Relle Island(s)
 Mab Island
 Marmot Island
 Mitkof Island
 Montague Island
 Nakchamik Island
 Naked Island
 Near Island
 Noyes Island
 Nuka Island
 Osier Island
 Otmeloi Island
 Outer Island
 Partofshikof Island
 Pearl Island
 Perry Island
 Pleasant Island
 Popof Island
 Powder Island
 Prince of Wales Island
 Rabbit Island
 Ragged Island
 Rugged Island
 Raspberry Island
 Revillagigedo Island
 Rootok Island
 San Fernando Island
 San Juan Island
 Sebree Island
 Sentinel Island
 Shelter Island
 Shikosi Island
 Shuyak Island
 Sinith Island(s)
 Sitkalidak Island
 Sitkinak Island
 Spruce Island
 Strawberry Island
 Suemez Island
 Sullivan Island
 Sutwik Island
 Talsani Island
 Tanker Island
 Tigalda Island
 Tugidak Island
 Twoheaded Island
 Uganik Island
 Unalaska Island
 Unalga Island
 Unavikshak Island
 Unga Island
 Warren Island
 Whale Island
 Wingham Island
 Wooded Island(s)
 Woronkofski Island
 Wrangell Island
 Yakobi Island
 Yukon Island
 Zarembo Island

References

External links 

 World Atlas: Gulf Of Alaska – Map & Description
 https://www.youtube.com/watch?v=AwgCKF0QcPU

Bodies of water of Alaska
Gulfs of the Pacific Ocean
Gulfs of the United States
Temperate Northern Pacific